William Pitt Kellogg (December 8, 1830 – August 10, 1918) was an American lawyer and Republican Party politician who served as a United States Senator from 1868 to 1872 and from 1877 to 1883 and as the Governor of Louisiana from 1873 to 1877 during the Reconstruction Era.

He was one of the most important politicians in Louisiana during and immediately after Reconstruction and was notable for being elected after most other Republican officials had been defeated when white Democrats regained control of state politics. He is also notable as one of few incumbent senators to be elected to the House of Representatives, where he served from 1883 to 1885. He was the last elected Republican governor of Louisiana until Dave Treen in 1980 and the last Republican to serve as a senator from Louisiana until David Vitter was elected in 2004.

Early life and education
Kellogg was born in Orwell, Vermont, near the New York border, where he spent his childhood. After completing his education in the common schools, he moved to Peoria, Illinois, at the age of eighteen and was a school teacher for several years. His fifth cousin William Kellogg lived in the area and served as a member of the United States House of Representatives from 1857 to 1863.

Career
Kellogg became a lawyer, likely "reading law" and studying with practicing lawyers, as was typical for many then. He moved to Canton, Illinois, and started a law practice. There he joined the U.S. Republican Party and eventually came to know Abraham Lincoln, a fellow lawyer. When Lincoln became president in 1861, he appointed Kellogg as Chief Justice of the Supreme Court of the Nebraska Territory. Kellogg moved to Nebraska.

With the outbreak of the American Civil War, Kellogg was granted a leave of absence and he returned to Illinois and joined the 7th Regiment Illinois Volunteer Cavalry. By 1862, he had risen to the rank of colonel and played an important role at a small battle near Sikeston, Missouri. Kellogg resigned because of ill health on June 1, 1862. He then returned to Nebraska and resumed his work as Chief Justice. After the Civil War, Kellogg was elected as a companion of the Military Order of the Loyal Legion of the United States.

In 1865, at the end of the Civil War, days before his assassination, Lincoln appointed Kellogg as the federal collector of customs of the port of New Orleans. This launched Kellogg's 20-year political career in Louisiana, notable as he was one of the first carpetbaggers. He remained Collector of New Orleans, despite complaints, until 1868, and was then elected to the United States Senate. That year, "reconstructed" Louisiana was readmitted to the federal Union.

In 1872, Kellogg ran on the Republican ticket and was elected governor. He resigned from the Senate to take office. In the election, John McEnery, a Democrat, ran against Kellogg. The sitting Governor Henry Clay Warmoth, although a Republican, opposed the Republican Party faction that was loyal to President Ulysses S. Grant, who was supporting Kellogg. Warmoth supported McEnery.

Former Confederate Assistant Secretary of War John Archibald Campbell was involved in the controversy surrounding Kellogg. He was a member of the "Committee of One Hundred" that went to Washington to persuade President Grant to end his support of what they called the "Kellogg usurpation". Grant initially refused to meet them but later relented. Campbell stated the case before Grant but was refused.

The results of the election were disputed by the Democrats. The politics of the state was in turmoil for months, as both candidates held inauguration celebrations, certified their local candidate slates and tried to gather political power. Political tensions broke out in violence, including the Colfax Massacre in April 1873. As Governor, Warmoth controlled the State Returning Board, the institution which administered elections. With the election challenged, Warmoth's board named McEnery the winner. A rival board claimed Kellogg to be the victor, although the board had no ballots or returns to count.

It was not only disputed by Democrats. Even the Republican-controlled U. S. Congress doubted the legitimacy of Kellogg's Carpetbag state government.

The House of Representatives declared that the Kellogg regime was "not much better than a successful conspiracy." The Senate threw out both returns of Louisiana's 1872 presidential electoral results. A Senate committee reported that the entire Louisiana 1872 election had been unfair and that both state governments were illegal. It recommended that a new election be held under federal supervision.

President Grant ignored the Senate committee recommendation and chose to put the force of the U. S. Army behind Kellogg's machine, perhaps because Grant's own brother-in-law, James Casey, was part of the machine. Casey also held the lucrative post of New Orleans Customs Collector, to which Grant reappointed him in March 1873.

In January 1875 even President Grant admitted that Louisiana's 1872 election "was a gigantic fraud, and there are no reliable returns of its result."

According to historian William Gillette, "By having invoked federal authority in civil law and having employed federal force in state politics, he [Grant] had mounted a successful coups d'état."

Warmoth was impeached for allegedly stealing the election. A black Republican, P. B. S. Pinchback, became governor for 35 days until Grant seated Kellogg as Governor with Federal protection. McEnery's faction established a "rump legislature" in New Orleans to oppose Kellogg's actions. McEnery urged his supporters to take up arms against Kellogg's fraudulent government. In 1874 the anti-Republican White League sent 5,000 paramilitary men into New Orleans, wherein the Battle of Liberty Place, they defeated the 3500-man Metropolitan Police and state militia. They took over the state government offices for a few days but retreated before the arrival of federal troops sent as reinforcements. President Grant had finally sent U.S. troops in response to Kellogg's request for help.

Kellogg's lieutenant governor was Caesar Antoine, an African-American native of New Orleans. He had been a State Senator from Shreveport before running as lieutenant governor. Despite the intense backlash against the Republican Party among white Democrats in the South, Kellogg was elected to the United States Senate in 1876. He served in the Senate until 1883. He did not seek re-election, for his party was too weak in the South to be competitive. He was the chairman of the Senate Committee on Railroads from 1881 to 1883.

Kellogg was elected to the United States House of Representatives in 1882, defeating the incumbent Democrat Chester Bidwell Darrall and served one term from 1883 to 1885. He was defeated for re-election in 1884 by Edward James Gay. He continued to live in Washington, D.C., but retired from political life. He died in Washington and is buried at Arlington National Cemetery in Virginia.

Kellogg was one of the most important politicians in Louisiana during and immediately after Reconstruction. He was able to maintain power for much longer than most Republican elected officials who had come to the area from the North. He is also notable as one of few senators to be elected to the House of Representatives immediately after leaving the Senate. (Claude Pepper, a 20th-century Florida Democrat, was similarly elected to the House after having served in the Senate but did not begin his long House tenure until 12 years after the end of his Senate service.)

References

External links
 
Google Books full online browsing copy
State of Louisiana - Biography
Cemetery Memorial by La-Cemeteries

1830 births
1918 deaths
People from Orwell, Vermont
Governors of Louisiana
People of Vermont in the American Civil War
Union Army colonels
Politicians from Peoria, Illinois
People from Canton, Illinois
American lawyers
Republican Party governors of Louisiana
Republican Party United States senators from Louisiana
Burials at Arlington National Cemetery
Washington, D.C., Republicans
Illinois Republicans
Nebraska Republicans
Republican Party members of the United States House of Representatives from Louisiana
19th-century American politicians
American lawyers admitted to the practice of law by reading law